The men's 500 metres races of the 2014–15 ISU Speed Skating World Cup 7, arranged in the Gunda Niemann-Stirnemann-Halle in Erfurt, Germany, was held on the weekend of 21–22 March 2015.

Race 1
Race one took place on Saturday, 21 March, scheduled in the afternoon session, at 14:18.

Race 2
Race two took place on Sunday, 22 March, scheduled at 14:31.

References

Men 0500
7